Bill Reichenbach may refer to:
William Frank Reichenbach Sr. (1923–2008), drummer for Charlie Byrd
Bill Reichenbach Jr. (born 1949), his son, trombonist